Giorgi Kharaishvili (born 29 July 1996) is a Georgian professional footballer who plays as a winger or attacking midfielder for Dinamo Tbilisi on loan from the Hungarian club Ferencváros.

Club career
Kharaishvili began his career in FC Saburtalo Tbilisi. He moved to IFK Göteborg in February 2018.

On 21 February 2023, Kharaishvili moved on loan to Dinamo Tbilisi.

International career
Kharaishvili made his debut for the Georgia national team on 23 January 2017 in a friendly against Uzbekistan.

Career statistics
Scores and results list Georgia's goal tally first, score column indicates score after each Kharaishvili goal.

Honours
Saburtalo Tbilisi
 Erovnuli Liga:2018
 Erovnuli Liga 2: 2014–15

IFK Göteborg
 Svenska Cupen: 2019–20

Ferencváros
 Nemzeti Bajnokság I: 2021–22
 Magyar Kupa: 2021–22

External links

References

1996 births
People from Marneuli
Living people
Footballers from Georgia (country)
Georgia (country) youth international footballers
Georgia (country) under-21 international footballers
Georgia (country) international footballers
Association football midfielders
FC Saburtalo Tbilisi players
IFK Göteborg players
Ferencvárosi TC footballers
FC Dinamo Tbilisi players
Erovnuli Liga players
Allsvenskan players
Nemzeti Bajnokság I players
Expatriate footballers from Georgia (country)
Expatriate sportspeople from Georgia (country) in Hungary
Expatriate footballers in Hungary
Expatriate sportspeople from Georgia (country) in Sweden
Expatriate footballers in Sweden